The 2020–21 season was the 98th season in the existence of Villarreal CF and the club's eighth consecutive season in the top flight of Spanish football. In addition to the domestic league, Villarreal participated in this season's editions of the Copa del Rey and the UEFA Europa League. The season covered the period from 20 July 2020 to 30 June 2021, with the late start to the season due to the COVID-19 pandemic in Spain.

On 23 July 2020, the club announced the appointment of three-time Europa League winner and former Spartak Moscow, Sevilla, Valencia, Paris Saint-Germain and Arsenal manager Unai Emery.

On 26 May 2021, Villarreal defeated Manchester United in the UEFA Europa League Final 11–10 on penalties following a 1–1 draw after extra time, winning the competition for the first time in club history.

The season was the first since 2005–06 without former captain Bruno Soriano, who retired after the 2019–20 season.

Players

Transfers

In

Out

Pre-season and friendlies

Competitions

Overall record

La Liga

League table

Results summary

Results by round

Matches
The league fixtures were announced on 31 August 2020.

Copa del Rey

UEFA Europa League

Group stage

The group stage draw was held on 2 October 2020.

Knockout phase

Round of 32
The draw for the round of 32 was held on 14 December 2020.

Round of 16
The draw for the round of 16 was held on 26 February 2021.

Quarter-finals
The draw for the quarter-finals was held on 19 March 2021.

Semi-finals
The draw for the semi-finals was held on 19 March 2021, after the quarter-final draw.

Final

Statistics

Squad statistics
Last updated 26 May 2021.

|-
! colspan=14 style=background:#dcdcdc; text-align:center|Goalkeepers

|-
! colspan=14 style=background:#dcdcdc; text-align:center|Defenders

|-
! colspan=14 style=background:#dcdcdc; text-align:center|Midfielders

|-
! colspan=14 style=background:#dcdcdc; text-align:center|Forwards

|-
! colspan=14 style=background:#dcdcdc; text-align:center| Players who have made an appearance or had a squad number this season but have left the club

|}

Goalscorers

Notes

References

External links

Villarreal CF seasons
Villarreal
Villarreal
UEFA Europa League-winning seasons